Pay No Mind may refer to:
 "Pay No Mind (Snoozer)", a 1994 song by Beck
 "Pay No Mind" (Culture Beat song), 1998
 "Pay No Mind", a song by Beach House from the 2018 album 7
 "Pay No Mind", a song by Alter Bridge from the 2019 album Walk the Sky